The George H. Crosman USAR Center Heliport  was a military heliport located within the George H. Crosman United States Army Reserve Center in Taunton, a city in Bristol County, Massachusetts,  United States. The heliport was government-owned and primarily used by the U.S. Army. It was situated at an elevation of 80 feet above mean sea level.

See also 
Greater Taunton Area
 List of military installations in Massachusetts

References 

Closed installations of the United States Army
Defunct airports in Massachusetts
Buildings and structures in Taunton, Massachusetts
Military heliports in the United States
Heliports in Massachusetts
Airports in Bristol County, Massachusetts